James Manning may refer to:

 James Manning (minister) (1738–1791), American Baptist minister and first president of Brown University
 James Manning (lawyer) (1781–1866), English barrister, serjeant-at-law, and law writer
 James S. Manning (1859–1938), Associate Justice of the North Carolina Supreme Court
 Jim Manning (baseball, born 1862) (1862–1929), American professional baseball player, manager and team owner
 James Manning (scientist) (1917–1989), surgeon, pathologist and public health administrator
 Jim Manning (pitcher) (1943–2020), American Major League Baseball pitcher
 James David Manning (born 1947), chief pastor at the ATLAH World Missionary Church
 James Manning (architect), English-born architect and builder, active in Perth, Western Australia
 James Manning Jr., Oregon state senator
 J. L. Manning (James Lionel Manning), British sports columnist
James Manning, character in Almost Married